The Malagasy rodents are the sole members of the subfamily Nesomyinae.  These animals are the only native rodents of Madagascar, come in many shapes and sizes, and occupy a wide variety of ecological niches.  There are nesomyines that resemble gerbils, rats, mice, voles, and even rabbits.  There are arboreal, terrestrial, and semi-fossorial varieties.

These rodents are clearly most closely related to some muroid rodents found on the African mainland.  Some molecular phylogeneticists consider this clade of Malagasy and African rodents to represent a distinct family, the Nesomyidae.  Other researchers place the Nesomyinae into a large family, Muridae, along with all members of the superfamily Muroidea.

It has been reported that the Nesomyinae is not monophyletic, but this has not been supported in other analyses.  Additionally, there were problems with this particular study, notably the use of Calomyscus as an outgroup while more distantly related muroids (rhyzomyines) were included in the ingroup.  It seems likely that all rodents in Madagascar are descendants from a single invasion of the island.

If monophyletic, the nesomyines represent one of only four colonization events of terrestrial mammals from mainland Africa.  The other groups are tenrecs, lemurs and Malagasy carnivorans.  Molecular clock analyses suggest that the ancestor of the nesomyines colonized Madagascar about 20-25 million years ago.  This is at approximately the same time as the Malagasy carnivorans, but is considerably more recent than the estimated colonization times of tenrecs and lemurs.

Nesomyinae contains 9 genera and 27 species.

Taxonomy
Subfamily Nesomyinae - Malagasy rodents
Genus Brachytarsomys - Malagasy white-tailed rats
White-tailed antsangy, Brachytarsomys albicauda
Brachytarsomys mahajambaensis (extinct)
Hairy-tailed antsangy, Brachytarsomys villosa
Genus Brachyuromys - Malagasy short-tailed rats
Betsileo short-tailed rat, Brachyuromys betsileoensis
Gregarious short-tailed rat, Brachyuromys ramirohitra
Genus Eliurus - Tufted-tailed rats
Tsingy tufted-tailed rat, Eliurus antsingy
Ankarana Special Reserve tufted-tailed rat, Eliurus carletoni
Ellerman's tufted-tailed rat, Eliurus ellermani
Daniel's tufted-tailed rat, Eliurus danieli
Grandidier's tufted-tailed rat, Eliurus grandidieri
Major's tufted-tailed rat, Eliurus majori
Lesser tufted-tailed rat, Eliurus minor
Dormouse tufted-tailed rat, Eliurus myoxinus
White-tipped tufted-tailed rat, Eliurus penicillatus
Petter's tufted-tailed rat, Eliurus petteri
Tanala tufted-tailed rat, Eliurus tanala
Webb's tufted-tailed rat, Eliurus webbi
Genus Gymnuromys
Voalavoanala, Gymnuromys roberti
Genus Hypogeomys
Votsovotsa (Malagasy giant rat), Hypogeomys antimena
Hypogeomys australis (extinct)
Genus Macrotarsomys - Big-footed mice
Bastard big-footed mouse, Macrotarsomys bastardi
Greater big-footed mouse, Macrotarsomys ingens
Petter's big-footed mouse, Macrotarsomys petteri
Genus Monticolomys
Malagasy mountain mouse, Monticolomys koopmani
Genus Nesomys
White-bellied nesomys, Nesomys audeberti
Western nesomys, Nesomys lambertoni
Nesomys narindaensis (extinct)
Island mouse, Nesomys rufus
Genus Voalavo
Eastern voalavo, Voalavo antsahabensis
Northern voalavo, Voalavo gymnocaudus

References

Nowak, R. M. 1999. Walker's Mammals of the World, Vol. 2. Johns Hopkins University Press, London.

 
Endemic fauna of Madagascar
Mammal subfamilies
Taxa named by Charles Immanuel Forsyth Major